Erigeron consimilis  is a North American species of flowering plants in the family Asteraceae known by the common names foothill fleabane and San Rafael fleabane. It is found in the western United States: Arizona, New Mexico, Utah, Colorado, Wyoming.

Erigeron consimilis  is a very small perennial herb up to 10 cm (4 inches) tall, forming a taproot. Most of the leaves are low and close to the ground. Each stem produces only one flower head, with 30–55 white or pink ray florets plus numerous yellow disc florets.

References

consimilis
Flora of the Western United States
Plants described in 1947
Flora without expected TNC conservation status
Taxa named by Arthur Cronquist